The 1998 Northern Arizona Lumberjacks football team was an American football team that represented Northern Arizona University (NAU) as a member of the Big Sky Conference (Big Sky) during the 1998 NCAA Division I-AA football season. In their first year under head coach Jerome Souers, the Lumberjacks compiled a 6–5 record (3–5 against conference opponents), outscored opponents by a total of 241 to 227, and tied for seventh place in the Big Sky.

The team played its home games at the J. Lawrence Walkup Skydome, commonly known as the Walkup Skydome, in Flagstaff, Arizona.

Schedule

References

Northern Arizona
Northern Arizona Lumberjacks football seasons
Northern Arizona Lumberjacks football